The former First Church of Christ, Scientist is located at 300 East Burlington Avenue in Fairfield, Iowa, United States.  It is an historic structure that on October 30, 1997 was determined to be eligible for addition to the National Register of Historic Places, but was not added. The building now houses St. Gabriel and All Angels Liberal Catholic Church.

National Register nomination
First Church of Christ Scientist (added 1999 - Building - #99000127)
Also known as St. Gabriel and All Angels Liberal Catholic Church
300 E. Burlington Ave., Fairfield
Historic Significance: 	Event
Area of Significance: 	Architecture
Period of Significance: 	1925-1949
Owner: 	Private
Historic Function: 	Religion
Historic Sub-function: Religious Structure
Current Function: 	Religion
Current Sub-function: 	Religious Structure

See also
List of Registered Historic Places in Iowa
List of former Christian Science churches, societies and buildings
First Church of Christ, Scientist (disambiguation)

References

External links
 National Register listings for Jefferson County
 St. Gabriel and All Angels Liberal Catholic Church website
 St. Gabriel's history
 Louden Machinery Company historic district walking tour listing

Buildings and structures in Jefferson County, Iowa
Former Christian Science churches, societies and buildings in Iowa
Churches completed in 1927
20th-century Christian Science church buildings
Fairfield, Iowa